Pleasant Vale may refer to:
Pleasant Vale Township, Pike County, Illinois
Pleasant Vale, United States Virgin Islands
Pleasant Vale, West Virginia